Gennevilliers is a station in Paris's express suburban rail system, the RER. It is situated in Gennevilliers, in the département of Hauts-de-Seine.

An interchange with tramway T1 is available.

See also 
 List of stations of the Paris RER

External links 

 

Réseau Express Régional stations in Hauts-de-Seine
Railway stations in France opened in 1988